Guo Yunqi (born 26 June 1997) is a Chinese footballer currently playing as a midfielder for Shijiazhuang Ever Bright.

Club career
Guo Yunqi would make his debut for Shijiazhuang Ever Bright on 19 September 2020 in a Chinese FA Cup game against Tianjin TEDA F.C. that ended in a 2-0 defeat.

Career statistics

References

External links

1997 births
Living people
Chinese footballers
Association football midfielders
Chinese Super League players
Cangzhou Mighty Lions F.C. players